The 2009 Nature Valley Grand Prix was the 9th edition of the Nature Valley Grand Prix stage race. It took place from June 10 through June 14 as part of the USA Cycling National Racing Calendar. The winner was Australian rider Rory Sutherland of  who won the race on the final criterium. The race included an Individual Time Trial, two road races and three criteriums.

Teams
The teams participating in the race were:

Stages

Stage 1
10 June 2009 – Saint Paul, 4.5 mi (ITT)

Stage 2
10 June 2009 – Saint Paul, 60 min

Stage 3
11 June 2009 – Cannon Falls, 60 mi

Stage 4
12 June 2009 – Uptown Minneapolis, 60 min

Stage 5
13 June 2009 – Mankato, 86 mi

Stage 6
14 June 2009 – Stillwater, 50 min

Classification leadership progress table

References

External links
 

2009
Nature Valley Grand Prix
Nature Valley Grand Prix
June 2009 sports events in the United States